Paarup is a village and western suburb of  Odense, in Funen, Denmark.

References

Suburbs of Odense
Populated places in Funen